Legal forms of gambling in the U.S. state of Maine include parimutuel wagering on horse races, the Maine Lottery, two casinos, and charitable gaming.

Horse racing
Parimutuel wagering on harness racing is permitted at the state's two racetracks, Scarborough Downs in Scarborough and Hollywood Casino Hotel & Raceway in Bangor. Brief harness racing meets of up to nine days each also occur at nine agricultural fairs throughout the state, from July to October, with wagering allowed.

Wagering is also offered at four off-track betting parlors around the state.

Casinos
Maine law allows two casinos: Hollywood Casino in Bangor and Oxford Casino in Oxford. The two casinos had a total annual net gaming revenue of $132 million as of 2016.

Slot machines at horse tracks were approved in a statewide referendum in 2003, but were rejected by voters in the city of Scarborough, leading to Bangor having the only permitted casino. The casino in Oxford was approved by a statewide referendum in 2010. The racino law was amended the following year to allow table games at Bangor.

Charitable gaming
Maine law permits many types of community organizations to conduct various games of chance for fundraising purposes, including bingo (with prizes up to $400), raffles (with prize values up to $75,000), and card games (generally with a maximum bet of $1 per hand).

Indian gaming
State law permits Maine's four federally recognized tribes to conduct high-stakes bingo games with unlimited prize values. The tribes do not have gaming rights that tribes in other states possess, because the Maine Indian Claims Settlement Act subjects the tribes' lands to state law, and excludes the Indian Gaming Regulatory Act from applying in the state.

Lottery
The Maine Lottery offers scratch-off and drawing games, including the multi-state Powerball and Mega Millions games.

See also
 Gambling in the United States

References

 
Maine law
Maine